RNZAF Base Auckland is a Royal New Zealand Air Force base located near the upper reaches of the Waitematā Harbour in Auckland, New Zealand. The base formerly comprised two separate airfields, Whenuapai and RNZAF Station Hobsonville. Hobsonville was established as a seaplane station in 1928 and was the RNZAF's primary flying boat base in New Zealand until 1967. Construction of Whenuapai as a base for Vickers Wellington bomber aircraft began in 1937, the hangars being built in 1939. Whenuapai was also Auckland's civil international airport from 1945 to 1965. After World War II Auckland became a centre for RNZAF transport and maritime squadrons. RNZAF Station Hobsonville was administratively joined with Whenuapai in 1965 to become RNZAF Base Auckland. Hobsonville subsequently became a grass airfield for No. 3 Squadron RNZAF, which later moved to Ohakea. A New Zealand Army unit comprising various personnel from different regiments as well as the New Zealand Special Air Service were relocated to Papakura Military Camp in 2003. 

Whenuapai was expected to close as well, with the Labour Government attempting to centralise the RNZAF at Ohakea. Infrastructure company Infratil and Waitākere College local body leaders studied the feasibility of developing Whenuapai into a commercial airport if the RNZAF moved to Ohakea. In 2009, the National Government overturned the Labour government's decision and decided to retain the air force base at Whenuapai and implemented a reconstruction programme.

A significant reconstruction phase has begun at RNZAF Base Whenuapai since the start of 2011, major works have been carried out on the main runway, taxiways, and also the relocation of several units from RNZAF Base Hobsonville. Further development will ensure the RNZAF will remain at the present location. A significant government spending programme has been carried out to ensure the present base is brought up to standard.

In 2016 new facilities were under construction to replace those lost with the closure of RNZAF Base Hobsonville or closed due to non-compliance with increased earthquake safety standards introduced following the 2011 Christchurch earthquake. This involves a new gymnasium, accommodation, a 25-metre weapons range, and a medical facility. All projects are expected to be completed by the end of 2016.

Additional funding will also improve areas to the flight line and aprons after a $30 million upgrade on the main runway and taxiways was completed in 2012.

Whenuapai and Hobsonville have both been used as Hollywood movie locations. In 1988 aircraft and base personnel were used for the film The Rescue. In 2004, the first scene for The Chronicles of Narnia: The Lion, the Witch and the Wardrobe was shot at the site (the railway scene). In 2012, Whenuapai was used for the film Emperor.

In January 2023, the P-3 Orions were retired from service, with 5 Squadron RNZAF relocating to RNZAF Base Ohakea with the P-8 Poseidon. About 250 personnel will move to Ohakea as part of the relocation.

The personnel strength is around 1500.

Flying Squadrons

Other units

 Base Headquarters 
 RNZAF Operations Squadron
 RNZAF Parachute Training and Support Unit
 RNZAF Security Forces Military Working Dog Training School
 RNZAF Aviation Medicine Unit
 RNZAF Survival Training Centre
 RNZAF Police
RNZAF Fire Rescue
Base Medical Flight

References

External links

 RNZAF Base Auckland

Auckland
Airports in New Zealand
Buildings and structures in Auckland
Transport buildings and structures in the Auckland Region
West Auckland, New Zealand